Dorothea Christiane Erxleben (13 November 1715 – 13 June 1762) was a German doctor who became the first female doctor of medicinal science in Germany.

Early life 
Dorothea was born on 13 November 1715 in the small town of Quedlinburg, Germany to the town’s progressive doctor, physician Christian Polycarp Leporin. Her father noticed her excelling at her schoolwork early on in life as well as her general brightness and arranged for Dorothea to be tutored in Latin, math and the sciences alongside her brother Tobias. When asked about his daughter’s studies, Christian Polycarp Leporin was noted as saying that gifted women’s talents are being wasted in the kitchen. The new ideas of enlightenment such as the values of Germany’s Burgertum had been embraced by the Leporin family, which led to Christian’s belief that both of his children should receive the best education possible. Tobias planned to study medicine at the University of Halle, and so Dorothea followed him. At the time, women had to receive special permission to attend university, so Dorothea’s father petitioned King Frederick the Great of Prussia to allow her entry into the University of Halle. Frederick the Great approved this request in April of 1741.

University years and marriage 
Dorothea’s admission into university was both criticized and admired. Critics like Johann Rhetius, a pamphleteer, argued that women were by law forbidden to practice medicine and therefore earning a degree in such a field would be a waste of time. Although Dorothea never publicly remarked on the controversy behind women’s education, she began to write her arguments and opinions on the topic down on paper, which were later published in 1742 as a book titled A Thorough Inquiry into the Causes Preventing the Female Sex from Studying. Her book argued for Germany to take advantage of the talents of half of its population, while her father Christian wrote a foreword that described the need for reform in Germany’s universities and how the admittance of women would spur this long-needed change.

Despite her admittance, Dorothea decided to postpone her university studies at the age of 26 to marry Johann Christian Erxleben, a widower who already had five children from his previous marriage. Their marriage was a generally happy one, and Dorothea went on to have four children with Johann over the next few years. Despite being busy at home for years managing her nine children, Dorothea was able to continue her medical studies at a slower pace.

Dorothea’s main influence in her life and career was Laura Bassi, an Italian physicist and academic who was the first woman in the world to be a professor at a university, the University of Bologna in her case.

Career 

In 1747 her father died and her husband's health began to deteriorate, leaving the Leporin family with serious debts. To pay off these debts, Dorothea began to practice medicine in Quedlinburg even without a degree, and became highly respected by the town. However, some of the local physicians felt their monopoly on medicine was being threatened and filed a law suit against Dorothea, charging her with medical quackery. The case rose through the courts and was brought before Frederick the Great in January 1754. The king ruled that Erxleben would have to pass an examination and submit a dissertation at the University of Halle, and with the support of the university's rector, Dorothea did just that.

Dorothea’s medical inaugural dissertation was titled Concerning the Swift and Pleasant but for that Reason less than Full Cure of Illnesses, in which she argued that doctors were too quick to prescribe unnecessary cures. She stated that doctors intervened too quickly to prescribe medicines like opiates for illnesses that did not require them and made several suggestions regarding the proper use of purgatives, best interventions to promote menstruation and urination, as well as the correct usage and dosage of opiates. Erxleben's dissertation quickly spread throughout Germany, particularly among women with health problems, and Erxleben even translated the dissertation from Latin into German to make it more accessible to the poor.

On 12 June 1754, Dorothea Erxleben received her M.D. degree, becoming the first woman in Germany to do so. She spent the rest of her life practicing medicine in her hometown of Quedlinburg. She died on 13 June 1762.

Legacy 
For nearly 150 years, German medical history did not see another woman. Only in the early 20th century would women once again become admitted into German medical schools. However, she is still a pioneer in this field for women and for her ideas about opiates and the proper use of medicines. Clinics and foundations have been named after her and on 17 September 1987, the German Federal Post Office issued a 60 pfennig postage stamp for the purpose of honoring Dorothea as part of its stamp series "The Women of German History".

On 13 November 2015, Google celebrated her 300th birthday with a Google Doodle.

References

Sources

Further reading
 
 

German women physicians
18th-century German physicians
1715 births
1762 deaths